Patrick Bussler (born 1 June 1984 in Munich) is a German snowboarder. He competed for Germany at the 2006 Winter Olympics in Men's parallel giant slalom. He was later selected to compete for Germany at the 2010 Winter Olympics.

References

External links
 
 

German male snowboarders
Olympic snowboarders of Germany
Snowboarders at the 2006 Winter Olympics
Snowboarders at the 2010 Winter Olympics
Snowboarders at the 2014 Winter Olympics
Snowboarders at the 2018 Winter Olympics
Sportspeople from Munich
1984 births
Living people
21st-century German people